The 2009–10 Israeli Hockey League season was the 19th season of Israel's hockey league. HC Ma'alot won their fourth Israeli championship.

Final Tournament

3rd place
 HC Herzlia - HC Metulla 7:1

Final
 HC Ma’alot - HC Bat-Yam 2:0

External links
 List of Israeli champions on hockeyarenas.net

Israeli League
Israeli League (ice hockey) seasons
Seasons